The ACC Women's Basketball Regular Season is the season-long competition  in basketball for the Atlantic Coast Conference (ACC). It has been held every season since 1977–78, several years before the first NCAA-sanctioned basketball games for women. It is a round-robin tournament with each team playing each other at least once.  The final standings decide the seedings for the conference tournament.

Standings by season

* top seed for tournament. + second seed for tournament.

Performance by school

Wake Forest was third in 1987–88; Georgia Tech was tied for third in 2011–12; Boston College was tied for fifth in 2007–08.

References

Regular season